"Got It Twisted" is the first single from Mobb Deep's 2004 album Amerikaz Nightmare. Produced by The Alchemist, the song samples the 1980s hit "She Blinded Me With Science" by Thomas Dolby. Big Noyd, Infamous Mobb, Jayo Felony, Kurupt, Illa Ghee, The Alchemist, DJ Felli Fel, and actor Danny Trejo are featured in the music video. There is also a remix which features Twista.

Track listing
Side A
"Got It Twisted" [Dirty Version]
"Got It Twisted" [Instrumental]

Side B
"Got It Twisted" [Clean Version]
"Got It Twisted" [Acappella]

Charts

Weekly charts

Year-end charts

Release history

References

2004 singles
Mobb Deep songs
Music videos directed by Benny Boom
Song recordings produced by the Alchemist (musician)
2004 songs
Jive Records singles
Songs written by Prodigy (rapper)
Songs written by Havoc (musician)